The Rumford River is a small river in southeastern Massachusetts, United States, that is a tributary of the Threemile River in the Taunton River watershed.

References

Rivers of Bristol County, Massachusetts
Taunton River watershed
Rivers of Massachusetts